Günther XXI von Schwarzburg (c. 1304 – 14 June 1349), disputed King of Germany, was a descendant of the counts of Schwarzburg.

Biography 
Born as the younger son of Henry VII, Count of Schwarzburg-Blankenburg (c. 1267 - 1324) and his wife, Christine von Gleichen (c. 1268).  He married Elisabeth von Honstein-Klettenberg (c. 1302 - 1380), daughter of Count Heinrich IV, on 9 September 1331. They had five children: Sophia von Schwarzburg-Blankenburg (c. 1331- aft.1351); Agnes von Schwarzburg-Blankenburg (1330-1399); 	
Elisabeth von Schwarzburg-Blankenburg (c. 1336 - 1380); Heinrich XIII de Schwarzburg-Bankenburg (c. 1338 - 1357), his childless heir; and Mechtild von Schwarzburg-Blankenburg (c. 1340-1370).

Günther distinguished himself as a diplomat in the service of Emperor Louis IV on whose death in 1347 he was offered the throne after it had been refused by Edward III of England. He was elected king at the Dominican monastery in Frankfurt on 30 January 1349 by the following four electors, who were partisans of the house of Wittelsbach and opponents of Charles (Karl) of Luxembourg, later the Emperor Charles IV: -

Louis, Margrave of Brandenburg
The Duke of Saxe-Lauenburg
The Elector Palatine
The deposed Elector of Mainz, Heinrich III von Virneberg.

Günther justified his legitimacy by the fact that - unlike Charles who was elected in Rhens - he had been chosen "at the right place," Frankfort. Günther argued also that Charles had not been crowned in the right place (not in Aachen, but in Bonn). Indeed, the city had recognized Charles IV's legitimacy after Ludwig's death and made Günther wait a week in the field before entering the city. It was not until 6 February that Günther moved into the city, where he was introduced to his office in the old tradition, confirmed the privileges of the city, and in return received homage from its citizens.

Charles, however, won over many of Günther's adherents and defeated Günther's army at the battle of Eltville on the Rhine River. Günther, who had become seriously ill, renounced all claims to the throne for the sum of 20,000 marks of silver on 26 May 1349 in the Treaty of Eltville, which also included amnesty for his followers.

Günther died three weeks later at the Johanniter monastery in Frankfurt, presumably from the Black Death. Günther himself suggested that he had been poisoned; however, this cannot be proven historically. 

At the instigation of Charles IV, Günther was buried in the Frankfurt Cathedral with royal honors. His headstone, a masterpiece of gothic art, was erected  in 1352. The Schwarzburgstraße and the Schwarzburgschule, as well as Güntherstraße in Frankfurt are named after him.

Opera
Günther von Schwarzburg is also the subject of a Singspiel in three acts by Ignaz Holzbauer, first performed in 1777.

Notes

References
Graf L. Utterodt zu Scharffenberg, Günther, Graf von Schwarzburg, erwählter deutscher König (Leipzig, 1862)
K. Janson, Das Königtum Günthers von Schwarzburg (Leipzig, 1880).

 Friedrich Lorenz Hoffmann: Günther von Schwarzburg, erwählter Römischer König. Rudolstadt 1819 (Digitalisat)
 Karl Janson: Das Königtum Günthers von Schwarzburg, 1880, 
 
 
 Ludwig Ütterodt zu Scharffenberg: Günther Graf von Schwarzburg, erwählter deutscher König, Neuscharffenberg 1862

1300s births
1349 deaths

Year of birth uncertain
14th-century Kings of the Romans
House of Schwarzburg
Anti-kings